In writing and typography, a ligature occurs where two or more graphemes or letters are joined to form a single glyph. Examples are the characters æ and œ used in English and French, in which the letters 'a' and 'e' are joined for the first ligature and the letters 'o' and 'e' are joined for the second ligature. For stylistic and legibility reasons, 'f' and 'i' are often merged to create 'ﬁ' (where the tittle on the 'i' merges with the hood of the 'f'); the same is true of 's' and 't' to create 'ﬆ'. The common ampersand (&) developed from a ligature in which the handwritten Latin letters 'E' and 't' (spelling , Latin for 'and') were combined.

History

The earliest known script Sumerian cuneiform and Egyptian hieratic both include many cases of character combinations that gradually evolve from ligatures into separately recognizable characters. Other notable ligatures, such as the Brahmic abugidas and the Germanic bind rune, figure prominently throughout ancient manuscripts. These new glyphs emerge alongside the proliferation of writing with a stylus, whether on paper or clay, and often for a practical reason: faster handwriting. Merchants especially needed a way to speed up the process of written communication  and found that conjoining letters and abbreviating words for lay use was more convenient for record keeping and transaction than the bulky long forms.

Around the 9th and 10th centuries, monasteries became a fountainhead for these type of script modifications. Medieval scribes who wrote in Latin increased their writing speed by combining characters and by introducing notational abbreviations. Others conjoined letters for aesthetic purposes. For example, in blackletter, letters with right-facing bowls (b, o, and p) and those with left-facing bowls (c, e, o, d, g and q) were written with the facing edges of the bowls superimposed. In many script forms, characters such as h, m, and n had their vertical strokes superimposed. Scribes also used notational abbreviations to avoid having to write a whole character in one stroke. Manuscripts in the fourteenth century employed hundreds of such abbreviations.

In handwriting, a ligature is made by joining two or more characters in an atypical fashion by merging their parts, or by writing one above or inside the other. In printing, a ligature is a group of characters that is typeset as a unit, so the characters do not have to be joined. For example, in some cases the fi ligature prints the letters f and i with a greater separation than when they are typeset as separate letters. When printing with movable type was invented around 1450, typefaces included many ligatures and additional letters, as they were based on handwriting. Ligatures made printing with movable type easier because one block would replace frequent combinations of letters and also allowed more complex and interesting character designs which would otherwise collide with one another.

Ligatures began to fall out of use because of their complexity in the 20th century. Sans serif typefaces, increasingly used for body text, generally avoid ligatures, though notable exceptions include Gill Sans and Futura. Inexpensive phototypesetting machines in the 1970s (which did not require journeyman knowledge or training to operate) also generally avoid them. A few, however, became characters in their own right, see below the sections about German ß, various Latin accented letters, & et al.

The trend against digraph use was further strengthened by the desktop publishing revolution. Early computer software in particular had no way to allow for ligature substitution (the automatic use of ligatures where appropriate), while most new digital typefaces did not include ligatures. As most of the early PC development was designed for the English language (which already treated ligatures as optional at best) dependence on ligatures did not carry over to digital. Ligature use fell as the number of traditional hand compositors and hot metal typesetting machine operators dropped because of the mass production of the IBM Selectric brand of electric typewriter in 1961. A designer active in the period commented: "some of the world's greatest typefaces were quickly becoming some of the world's worst fonts."

Ligatures have grown in popularity in the 21st century because of an increasing interest in creating typesetting systems that evoke arcane designs and classical scripts. One of the first computer typesetting programs to take advantage of computer-driven typesetting (and later laser printers) was Donald Knuth's TeX program. Now the standard method of mathematical typesetting, its default fonts are explicitly based on nineteenth-century styles. Many new fonts feature extensive ligature sets; these include FF Scala, Seria and others by Martin Majoor and Hoefler Text by Jonathan Hoefler. Mrs Eaves by Zuzana Licko contains a particularly large set to allow designers to create dramatic display text with a feel of antiquity.
A parallel use of ligatures is seen in the creation of script fonts that join letterforms to simulate handwriting effectively. This trend is caused in part by the increased support for other languages and alphabets in modern computing, many of which use ligatures somewhat extensively. This has caused the development of new digital typesetting techniques such as OpenType, and the incorporation of ligature support into the text display systems of macOS, Windows, and applications like Microsoft Office. An increasing modern trend is to use a "Th" ligature which reduces spacing between these letters to make it easier to read, a trait infrequent in metal type.

Today, modern font programming divides ligatures into three groups, which can be activated separately: standard, contextual and historical. Standard ligatures are needed to allow the font to display without errors such as character collision. Designers sometimes find contextual and historic ligatures desirable for creating effects or to evoke an old-fashioned print look.

Latin alphabet

Stylistic ligatures 

Many ligatures combine f with the following letter. A particularly prominent example is ﬁ (or fi, rendered with two normal letters). The tittle of the i in many typefaces collides with the hood of the f when placed beside each other in a word, and are combined into a single glyph with the tittle absorbed into the f. Other ligatures with the letter f include fj, fl (ﬂ), ff (ﬀ), ffi (ﬃ), and ffl (ﬄ). Ligatures for fa, fe, fo, fr, fs, ft, fb, fh, fu, fy, and for f followed by a full stop, comma, or hyphen are also used, as well as the equivalent set for the doubled ff.

These arose because with the usual type sort for lowercase f, the end of its hood is on a kern, which would be damaged by collision with raised parts of the next letter.

Ligatures crossing the morpheme boundary of a composite word are sometimes considered incorrect, especially in official German orthography as outlined in the Duden. An English example of this would be ff in shelfful; a German example would be  ("boat trip"). Some computer programs (such as TeX) provide a setting to disable ligatures for German, while some users have also written macros to identify which ligatures to disable.

Turkish distinguishes dotted and dotless "I". The fi ligature is therefore not used in Turkish typography, and neither are other ligatures like that for fl, which would be rare anyway because of Turkish Phonotactics.

Instead, the "sz" ligature has merged into a single character, the German ß – see below.

Sometimes, ligatures for st (ﬆ), ſt (ﬅ), ch, ck, ct, Qu and Th are used (e.g. in the typeface Linux Libertine).

Besides conventional ligatures, in the metal type era some newspapers commissioned custom condensed single sorts for the names of common long names that might appear in news headings, such as "Eisenhower", "Chamberlain", and others. In these cases the characters did not appear combined, just more tightly spaced than if printed conventionally.

German ß

There is no general consensus about its history. Its name  (meaning S-Z) suggests a connection of "long s and z" (ſʒ) but the Latin script also knows a ligature of "long s over round s" (ſs). The latter is used as the design principle for the character in most of today's typefaces. Since German was mostly set in blackletter typefaces until the 1940s, and those typefaces were rarely set in uppercase, a capital version of the  never came into common use, even though its creation has been discussed since the end of the 19th century. Therefore, the common replacement in uppercase typesetting was originally SZ ( "measure" → , different from  "mass" → ) and later SS ( → ). Until 2017, the SS replacement was the only valid spelling according to the official orthography in Germany and Austria. In Switzerland, the ß is omitted altogether in favour of ss. The capital version (ẞ) of the Eszett character was occasionally used since 1905/06, has been part of Unicode since 2008, and has appeared in more and more typefaces. Since the end of 2010, the  has suggested the new upper case character for "ß" rather than replacing it with "SS" or "SZ" for geographical names. A new standardized German keyboard layout (DIN 2137-T2) has included the capital ß since 2012. The new character entered the official orthographic rules in June 2017.

Massachusett ꝏ
In the orthography in use since 2000 in the Wampanoag communities participating in the Wôpanâak Language Reclamation Project, the ligature was replaced with the numeral , partly because of its ease in typesetting and display as well as its similarity to the o-u ligature  used in Abenaki. For example, compare the colonial-era spelling  with the modern  spelling .

Letter W 
As the letter W is an addition to the Latin alphabet that originated in the seventh century, the phoneme it represents was formerly written in various ways. In Old English, the runic letter wynn (Ƿ) was used, but Norman influence forced wynn out of use. By the 14th century, the "new" letter W, originated as two Vs or Us joined, developed into a legitimate letter with its own position in the alphabet. Because of its relative youth compared to other letters of the alphabet, only a few European languages (English, Dutch, German, Polish, Welsh, Maltese, and Walloon) use the letter in native words.

Æ and Œ 
The character Æ (lower case æ; in ancient times named ) when used in the Danish, Norwegian, or Icelandic languages, as well as in the related Old English language, is not a typographic ligature. It is a distinct letter—a vowel—and when alphabetised, is given a different place in the alphabetic order.

In modern English orthography, Æ is not considered an independent letter but a spelling variant, for example: "encyclopædia" versus "encyclopaedia" or "encyclopedia". In this use, Æ comes from Medieval Latin, where it was an optional ligature in some specific words that had been transliterated and borrowed from Ancient Greek, for example, "Æneas". It is still found as a variant in English and French words descended or borrowed from Medieval Latin, but the trend has recently been towards printing the A and E separately. This means that, although both Old English and Modern English have made use of the character, the purposes were different.

Similarly, Œ and œ, while normally printed as ligatures in French, are replaced by component letters if technical restrictions require it.

Umlaut 
In German orthography, the umlauted vowels ä, ö, and ü historically arose from ae, oe, ue ligatures (strictly, from superscript e, viz. aͤ, oͤ, uͤ). It is common practice to replace them with ae, oe, ue digraphs when the diacritics are unavailable, for example in electronic conversation. Phone books treat umlauted vowels as equivalent to the relevant digraph (so that a name Müller will appear at the same place as if it were spelled Mueller; German surnames have a strongly fixed orthography, either a name is spelled with ü or with ue); however, the alphabetic order used in other books treats them as equivalent to the simple letters a, o and u. The convention in Scandinavian languages and Finnish is different: there the umlaut vowels are treated as independent letters with positions at the end of the alphabet.

Ring 
The ring diacritic used in vowels such as å likewise originated as an o-ligature. Before the replacement of the older "aa" with "å" became a  practice, an "a" with another "a" on top (aͣ) could sometimes be used, for example in Johannes Bureus's, Runa: ABC-Boken (1611). The uo ligature ů in particular saw use in Early Modern High German, but it merged in later Germanic languages with u (e.g. MHG , ENHG , Modern German  "foot"). It survives in Czech, where it is called .

Tilde and circumflex 
The tilde diacritic, used in Spanish as part of the letter ñ, representing the palatal nasal consonant, and in Portuguese for nasalization of a vowel, originated in ligatures where n followed the base letter:  → . Similarly, the circumflex in French spelling stems from the ligature of a silent s.

Hwair 
The letter hwair (ƕ), used only in transliteration of the Gothic language, resembles a hw ligature. It was introduced by philologists around 1900 to replace the digraph hv formerly used to express the phoneme in question, e.g. by Migne in the 1860s ( vol. 18).

Byzantine Ȣ 
The Byzantines had a unique o-u ligature (Ȣ) that, while originally based on the Greek alphabet's ο-υ, carried over into Latin alphabets as well. This ligature is still seen today on icon artwork in Greek Orthodox churches, and sometimes in graffiti or other forms of informal or decorative writing.

Gha (OI) 
Gha (ƣ), a rarely used letter based on Q and G, was misconstrued by the ISO to be an OI ligature because of its appearance, and is thus known (to the ISO and, in turn, Unicode) as "Oi". Historically, it was used in many Latin-based orthographies of Turkic (e.g., Azerbaijani) and other central Asian languages.

International Phonetic Alphabet 

Initial Teaching Alphabet 
The Initial Teaching Alphabet, a short-lived alphabet intended for young children, used a number of ligatures to represent long vowels: ꜷ, æ, œ, ᵫ, ꭡ, and ligatures for ee, ou and oi that are not encoded in Unicode. Ligatures for consonants also existed, including ligatures of ʃh, ʈh, wh, ʗh, ng and a reversed t with h (neither the reversed t nor any of the consonant ligatures are in Unicode).

Rare ligatures 

Symbols originating as ligatures

The most common ligature is the ampersand &. This was originally a ligature of E and t, forming the Latin word "et", meaning "and". It has exactly the same use in French and in English. The ampersand comes in many different forms. Because of its ubiquity, it is generally no longer considered a ligature, but a logogram. Like many other ligatures, it has at times been considered a letter (e.g., in early Modern English); in English it is pronounced "and", not "et", except in the case of &c, pronounced "et cetera". In most fonts, it does not immediately resemble the two letters used to form it, although certain typefaces use designs in the form of a ligature (examples include the original versions of Futura and Univers, Trebuchet MS, and Civilité, known in modern times as the italic of Garamond).

Similarly, the number sign # originated as a stylized abbreviation of the Roman term , written as ℔. Over time, the number sign was simplified to how it is seen today, with two horizontal strokes across two slash-like strokes. Now a logogram, the symbol is used mainly to denote (in the US) numbers, and weight in pounds. It has also been used popularly on push-button telephones and as the hashtag indicator.

The at sign @ is potentially a ligature, but there are many different theories about the origin. One theory says that the French word "à", meaning "at", was simplified by scribes who, instead of writing the grave accent, drew an arc around the "a". Another states that it is short for the Latin word for "toward", "ad", with the "d" being represented by the arc. Another says it is short for an abbreviation of the term "each at", with the "e" encasing the "a". Around the 18th century, it started being used in commerce to indicate price per unit, as "15 units @ $1". After the popularization of Email, this fairly unpopular character became widely known, used to tag specific users.

The dollar sign $ possibly originated as a ligature (for "pesos", although there are other theories as well) but is now a logogram. At least once, the United States dollar used a symbol resembling an overlapping U-S ligature, with the right vertical bar of the U intersecting through the middle of the S ( US ) to resemble the modern dollar sign.

The Spanish peseta was sometimes symbolized by a ligature  (from Pts), and the French franc was often symbolized by the ligature  (from Fr).

In astronomy, the planetary symbol for Mercury may be a ligature of Mercury's caduceus and a cross (which was added in the 16th century to Christianize the pagan symbol), though other sources disagree; the symbol for Venus may be a ligature of the Greek letters ϕ (phi) and κ (kappa). The symbol for Jupiter, descends from a Greek zeta with a horizontal stroke, as an abbreviation for Zeus.
 
It later came to look like a lower-case Greek eta, with the cross added at the top in the 16th century to Christianize it. 
The dwarf planet Pluto is symbolized by a PL ligature, ♇. 

A different PL ligature, ⅊, represents the property line in surveying. 

In engineering diagrams, a CL ligature, ℄, represents the center line of an object.

The interrobang ‽ is an unconventional punctuation meant to combine the interrogation point (or the question mark) and the bang (printer's slang for exclamation mark) into one symbol, used to denote a sentence which is both a question and is exclaimed. For example, the sentence "Are you really coming over to my house on Friday‽" shows that the speaker is surprised while asking their question.

Digraphs

Digraphs, such as ll in Spanish or Welsh, are not ligatures in the general case as the two letters are displayed as separate glyphs: although written together, when they are joined in handwriting or italic fonts the base form of the letters is not changed and the individual glyphs remain separate. Like some ligatures discussed above, these digraphs may or may not be considered individual letters in their respective languages. Until the 1994 spelling reform, the digraphs ch and ll were considered separate letters in Spanish for collation purposes.

The difference can be illustrated with the French digraph , which is composed of the ligature  and the simplex letter .

Dutch IJ 
Dutch , however, is somewhat more ambiguous. Depending on the standard used, it can be considered a digraph, a ligature or a letter in itself, and its upper case and lower case forms are often available as a single glyph with a distinctive ligature in several professional fonts (e.g. Zapfino).

Non-Latin alphabets

Ligatures are not limited to Latin script:
The Armenian alphabet has the following ligatures: և (ե+ւ), ﬔ (մ+ե), ﬕ (մ+ի), ﬓ (մ+ն), ﬗ (մ+խ), ﬖ (վ+ն)
The Brahmic abugidas make frequent use of ligatures in consonant clusters. The number of ligatures employed is language-dependent; thus many more ligatures are conventionally used in Devanagari when writing Sanskrit than when writing Hindi. Having 37 consonants in total, the total number of ligatures that can be formed in Devanagari using only two letters is 1369, though few fonts are able to render all of them. In particular, Mangal, which is included with Microsoft Windows' Indic support, does not correctly handle ligatures with consonants attached to the right of the characters द, ट, ठ, ड, and ढ, leaving the virama attached to them and displaying the following consonant in its standard form.
The Georgian script includes უ (uni), which is a combination of ო (oni) and the former letter ჳ (vie).
A number of ligatures have been employed in the Greek alphabet, in particular a combination of omicron (Ο) and upsilon (Υ), which later gave rise to a letter of the Cyrillic script—see Ou (letter). Among the ancient Greek acrophonic numerals, ligatures were common (in fact, the ligature of a short-legged capital pi was a key feature of the acrophonic numeral system).
Cyrillic ligatures: Љ, Њ, Ы, Ѿ. Iotified Cyrillic letters are ligatures of the early Cyrillic decimal I and another vowel: Ꙗ, Ѥ, Ѩ, Ѭ, Ю (sometimes also spelled ЮУ). Two letters of the Bosnian, Macedonian and Serbian Cyrillic alphabets, lje and nje (љ, њ), were developed in the nineteenth century as ligatures of Cyrillic El and En (л, н) with the soft sign (ь). Yae, a ligature of ya (Я) and e also exists: Ԙԙ, as do Dzze (Ꚉꚉ ← Д + З) and Zhwe (Ꚅꚅ ← З + Ж).
Some forms of the Glagolitic script, used from Middle Ages to the 19th century to write some Slavic languages, have a box-like shape that lends itself to more frequent use of ligatures.
In the Hebrew alphabet, the letters aleph and lamed can form a ligature, . The ligature appears in some pre-modern texts (mainly religious), or in Judeo-Arabic texts, where that combination is very frequent, since [ʔ] [a]l- (written aleph plus lamed, in the Hebrew script) is the definite article in Arabic. For example, the word Allah can be written with this ligature: .
In the Arabic alphabet, historically a cursive derived from the Nabataean alphabet, most letters' shapes depend on whether they are followed (word-initial), preceded (word-final) or both (medial) by other letters. For example, Arabic mīm, isolated , tripled (mmm, rendering as initial, medial and final): . Notable are the shapes taken by lām + ʼalif isolated: , and lām + ʼalif medial or final: . Besides the obligatory lām + ʼalif ligature, Arabic script grammar requires numerous stylistic ligatures.
Syriac, a semitic alphabet derived from the Aramaic alphabet, has three different scripts that all use ligatures. Like Arabic, some letters change their form depending on their position in relation to other letters, and this can also change how ligatures look. A popular ligature all three scripts use is Lamadh / + Alap / isolated and final: (Serto) , (Madnhaya) . Another popular one is Taw / + Alap /, resulting in (Serto) , (Madhnhaya) . All three scripts use ligatures, but not in an equal spread or always with the same letters. Serto, being a flexible script, especially has many ligatures. For a wider, but not complete, list of Syriac ligatures, see Contextual forms of letters.
Urdu (one of the main languages of South Asia), which uses a calligraphic version of the Arabic-based Nastaʿlīq script, requires a great number of ligatures in digital typography. InPage, a widely used desktop publishing tool for Urdu, uses Nastaliq fonts with over 20,000 ligatures.
In American Sign Language a ligature of the American manual alphabet is used to sign "I love you", from the English initialism ILY. It consists of the little finger of the letter I plus the thumb and forefinger of the letter L. The letter Y (little finger and thumb) overlaps with the other two letters.
The Japanese language has a number of obsolete kana ligatures. Of these, only two are widely available ones on computers: one for hiragana, ゟ, which is a vertical writing ligature of the characters よ and り; and one for katakana, ヿ, which is a vertical writing ligature of the characters コ and ト.
Lao uses three ligatures, all comprising the letter ຫ (h). As a tonal language, most consonant sounds in Lao are represented by two consonants, which will govern the tone of the syllable. Five consonant sounds are only represented by a single consonant letter (ງ (ŋ), ນ (m), ມ (n), ລ (l), ວ (w)), meaning that one cannot render all the tones for words beginning with these sounds. A silent ຫ indicates that the syllable should be read with the tone rules for ຫ, rather than those of the following consonant. Three consonants can form ligatures with the letter ຫ. ຫ+ນ=ໜ (n), ຫ+ມ=ໝ (m) and ຫ+ລ=ຫຼ (l). ງ (ŋ) and ວ (w) just form clusters: ຫງ (ŋ) and ຫວ (w). ລ (l) can also be used written in a cluster rather than as a ligature: ຫລ (l).
In many runic texts ligatures are common. Such ligatures are known as bind-runes and were optional.

Chinese ligatures

Written Chinese has a long history of creating new characters by merging parts or wholes of other Chinese characters. However, a few of these combinations do not represent morphemes but retain the original multi-character (multiple morpheme) reading and are therefore not considered true characters themselves.

In 1924,  (1898–1967) created the ligature  from two of the three characters , meaning "library".

Similar to the ligatures were several "two-syllable Chinese characters" created in the 19th century as Chinese characters for SI units. In Chinese these units are disyllabic and standardly written with two characters, as   "centimeter" ( centi-,  meter) or   "kilowatt". These have now fallen out of general use, but are occasionally seen.

Computer typesetting

The OpenType font format includes features for associating multiple glyphs to a single character, used for ligature substitution. Typesetting software may or may not implement this feature, even if it is explicitly present in the font's metadata. XeTeX is a TeX typesetting engine designed to make the most of such advanced features. This type of substitution used to be needed mainly for typesetting Arabic texts, but ligature lookups and substitutions are being put into all kinds of Western Latin OpenType fonts. In OpenType, there are standard liga, historical hlig, contextual clig, discretionary dlig and required rlig ligatures. These can be enabled or disabled in CSS3 using font-feature-settings.

TeX

Opinion is divided over whether it is the job of writers or typesetters to decide where to use ligatures. TeX is an example of a computer typesetting system that makes use of ligatures automatically. The Computer Modern Roman typeface provided with TeX includes the five common ligatures ff, fi, fl, ffi, and ffl. When TeX finds these combinations in a text, it substitutes the appropriate ligature, unless overridden by the typesetter.

CSS

CSS supports font-variant-ligatures. common-ligatures, discretionary-ligatures, historical-ligatures and contextual are supported.

Ligatures in Unicode (Latin alphabets)
This table below shows discrete letter pairs on the left, the corresponding Unicode ligature in the middle column, and the Unicode code point on the right. Provided you are using an operating system and browser that can handle Unicode, and have the correct Unicode fonts installed, some or all of these will display correctly. See also the provided graphic.

Unicode maintains that ligaturing is a presentation issue rather than a character definition issue, and that, for example, "if a modern font is asked to display 'h' followed by 'r', and the font has an 'hr' ligature in it, it can display the ligature." Accordingly, the use of the special Unicode ligature characters is "discouraged", and "no more will be encoded in any circumstances". (Unicode has continued to add ligatures, but only in such cases that the ligatures were used as distinct letters in a language or could be interpreted as standalone symbols. For example, ligatures such as æ and œ are not used to replace arbitrary "ae" or "oe" sequences; it is generally considered incorrect to write "does" as "dœs".)

Microsoft Word disables ligature substitution by default, largely for backward compatibility when editing documents created in earlier versions of Word. Users can enable automatic ligature substitution on the Advanced tab of the Font dialog box.

LibreOffice Writer enables standard ligature substitution by default for OpenType fonts, user can enable or disable any ligature substitution on the Features dialog box, which is accessible via the Features button of the Character dialog box, or alternatively, input a syntax with font name and feature into the Font Name input box, for example: Noto Sans:liga=0.

{| class="wikitable sortable"
! Non-ligature
! Ligature
! data-sort-type="number" | Unicode
! class="unsortable"|HTML
|-
| AA, aa
| Ꜳ, ꜳ
| data-sort-value="42802"|U+A732, U+A733
| &#xA732; &#xA733;
|-
| AE, ae
| Æ, æ
| data-sort-value="198"|U+00C6, U+00E6
| &AElig; &aelig;
|-
| AO, ao
| Ꜵ, ꜵ
| data-sort-value="42804"|U+A734, U+A735
| &#xA734; &#xA735;
|-
| AU, au
| Ꜷ, ꜷ
| data-sort-value="42806"|U+A736, U+A737
| &#xA736; &#xA737;
|-
| AV, av
| Ꜹ, ꜹ
| data-sort-value="42808"|U+A738, U+A739
| &#xA738; &#xA739;
|-
| AV, av (with bar)
| Ꜻ, ꜻ
| data-sort-value="42810"|U+A73A, U+A73B
| &#xA73A; &#xA73B;
|-
| AY, ay
| Ꜽ, ꜽ
| data-sort-value="42812"|U+A73C, U+A73D
| &#xA73C; &#xA73D;
|-
| et
| 🙰
| data-sort-value="128624"|U+1F670
| &#x1F670;
|-
| ff
| ﬀ
| data-sort-value="64256"|U+FB00
| &#xFB00;
|-
| ffi
| ﬃ
| data-sort-value="64259"|U+FB03
| &#xFB03;
|-
| ffl
| ﬄ
| data-sort-value="64260"|U+FB04
| &#xFB04;
|-
| fi
| ﬁ
| data-sort-value="64257"|U+FB01
| &#xFB01;
|-
| fl
| ﬂ
| data-sort-value="64258"|U+FB02
| &#xFB02;
|-
| Hv, hv
| Ƕ, ƕ
| U+01F6, U+0195
|&#502; &#405;
|-
| lb
| ℔
| U+2114
| &#8468; &#x2114;
|-
| lL, ll
| Ỻ, ỻ
| U+1EFA, U+1EFB
|&#7930; &#7931;
|-
| OE, oe
| Œ, œ
| data-sort-value="338"|U+0152, U+0153
| &OElig; &oelig;
|-
| OO, oo
| Ꝏ, ꝏ
| data-sort-value="42830"|U+A74E, U+A74F
| &#xA74E; &#xA74F;
|-
| ɔe
| ꭢ
| U+AB62
|&#43874;
|-
|data-sort-value="ss"| ſs, ſz
| ẞ, ß
| data-sort-value="223"|U+1E9E, U+00DF
| &szlig;
|-
| st
| ﬆ
| data-sort-value="64262"|U+FB06
| &#xFB06;
|-
|data-sort-value="st"| ſt
| ﬅ
| data-sort-value="64261"|U+FB05
| &#xFB05;
|-
| TZ, tz
| Ꜩ, ꜩ
| data-sort-value="42792"|U+A728, U+A729
| &#xA728; &#xA729;
|-
| ue
| ᵫ
| data-sort-value="7531"|U+1D6B
| &#x1D6B;
|-
| uo
| ꭣ
| U+AB63
|&#43875;
|-
| VV, vv
| W, w
| U+0057, U+0077
| &#87; &#119;
|-
| VY, vy
| Ꝡ, ꝡ
| data-sort-value="42848"|U+A760, U+A761
| &#xA760; &#xA761;
|}

There are separate code points for the digraph DZ, the Dutch digraph IJ, and for the Bosnian, Croatian, Serbian digraphs DŽ, LJ, and NJ. Although similar, these are digraphs, not ligatures. See Digraphs in Unicode.

 Ligatures used only in phonetic transcription

{| class="wikitable sortable"
! Non-ligature
! Ligature
! data-sort-type="number" | Unicode
! class="unsortable"|HTML
|-
| superscript small capital AA
| 𐞀
| data-sort-value="67456"|U+10780
|&#x10780;
|-
| superscript ae
| 𐞃
| data-sort-value="67459"|U+10783
|&#x10783;
|-
| aə
| ꬱ
| U+AB31
|&#43825;
|-
| əø
| ꭁ
| U+AB41
|&#43841;
|-
| db
| ȸ
| data-sort-value="568"|U+0238
| &#x238;
|-
| dz
| ʣ
| data-sort-value="675"| U+02A3
| &#x2A3;
|-
| dʐ
| ꭦ
| U+AB66 
|&#43878;
|-
| dʑ (or dz curl)
| ʥ
| data-sort-value="677"| U+02A5
| &#x2A5;
|-
| dʒ (or dezh)
| ʤ
| data-sort-value="676"| U+02A4
| &#x2A4;
|-
| dʒ with palatal hook
| 𝼒
| data-sort-value="122642"| U+1DF12
| &#x1DF12;
|-
| dʒ with retroflex hook
| 𝼙
| data-sort-value="122649"| U+1DF19
| &#x1DF19;
|-
| fŋ (or feng)
| ʩ
| data-sort-value="681"| U+02A9
| &#x2A9;
|-
| Superscript fŋ
| 𐞐
| U+10790
| &#67472;
|-
| fŋ with trill
| 𝼀
| data-sort-value="122624"| U+1DF00
| &#x1DF00;
|-
| ls (or less)
| ʪ
| data-sort-value="682"| U+02AA
| &#x2AA;
|-
| superscript ls
| 𐞙
| U+10799
| &#67481;
|-
| lz
| ʫ
| data-sort-value="683"| U+02AB
| &#x2AB;
|-
| superscript lz
| 𐞚
| U+1079A
| &#67482;
|-
| lʒ (or lezh)
| ɮ
| data-sort-value="622"| U+026E
| &#x26E;
|-
| superscript lʒ
| 𐞞
| data-sort-value="67486"| U+1079E
| &#x1079E;
|-
| lʒ with retroflex hook
| 𝼅
| data-sort-value="1DF05"| U+1DF05
| &#x1DF05;
|-
| superscript lʒ with retroflex hook
| 𐞟
| data-sort-value="67487"| U+1079F
| &#x1079F;
|-
| oə
| ꭀ
| data-sort-value="43840"|U+AB40
| &#xAB40;
|-
| qp
| ȹ
| data-sort-value="569"| U+0239
| &#x239;
|-
|data-sort-value="tc"| tɕ (or tc curl)
| ʨ
| data-sort-value="680"| U+02A8
| &#x2A8;
|-
|data-sort-value="superscript tc"| superscript tɕ
| 𐞫
| data-sort-value="67499"| U+107AB
| &#x107AB;
|-
| ts (or tess)
| ʦ
| data-sort-value="678"| U+02A6
| &#x2A6;
|-
| superscript ts
| 𐞬
| data-sort-value="67500"| U+107AC
| &#x107AC;
|-
| ts with retroflex hook
| ꭧ
| data-sort-value="43879"| U+AB67
| &#xAB67;
|-
| superscript ts with retroflex hook
| 𐞭
| data-sort-value="67501"| U+107AD
| &#x107AD;
|-
| tʂ
| ꭧ
| U+AB67
|&#43879;
|-
| tʃ (or tesh)
| ʧ
| data-sort-value="679"| U+02A7
| &#x2A7;
|-
| superscript tʃ
| 𐞮
| data-sort-value="67502"| U+107AE
| &#x107AE;
|-
| tʃ with retroflex hook
| 𝼜
| data-sort-value="122652"| U+1DF1C
| &#x1DF1C;
|-
| tʃ with palatal hook
| 𝼗
| data-sort-value="122647"| U+1DF17
| &#x1DF17;
|-
| ui
| ꭐ
| data-sort-value="43856"|U+AB50
| &#xAB50;
|-
| turned ui
| ꭑ
| data-sort-value="43857"|U+AB51
| &#xAB51;
|-
| uu
| ɯ
| U+026F
| &#623;
|}
Four "ligature ornaments" are included from U+1F670 to U+1F673 in the Ornamental Dingbats block: regular and bold variants of ℯT (script e and T) and of ɛT (open E and T).

Contemporary art

Typographic ligatures are used in a form of contemporary art, as can be illustrated by Chinese artist Xu Bing's work in which he combines Latin letters to form characters that resemble Chinese.

See also

 
 
 
Scribal abbreviations (Roman and medieval abbreviations used to save space in manuscripts and epigraphs)

Notes and references

Notes

References

External links
Examples of CSS ligatures

 
Palaeography
 
Typography